Chief Township is a township in Mahnomen County, Minnesota, United States. The population was 132 at the 2000 census.

Chief Township was named for an Ojibwe chieftain.

Geography

Demographics
As of the census of 2000, there were 132 people, 48 households, and 37 families residing in the township. The population density was 3.8 people per square mile (1.5/km2). There were 55 housing units at an average density of 1.6/sq mi (0.6/km2). The racial makeup of the township was 85.61% White, 8.33% Native American, and 6.06% from two or more races.

There were 48 households, out of which 31.3% had children under the age of 18 living with them, 64.6% were married couples living together, 6.3% had a female householder with no husband present, and 22.9% were non-families. 20.8% of all households were made up of individuals, and 8.3% had someone living alone who was 65 years of age or older. The average household size was 2.75 and the average family size was 3.16.

In the township the population was spread out, with 29.5% under the age of 18, 6.8% from 18 to 24, 25.0% from 25 to 44, 19.7% from 45 to 64, and 18.9% who were 65 years of age or older. The median age was 40 years. For every 100 females, there were 123.7 males. For every 100 females age 18 and over, there were 126.8 males.

The median income for a household in the township was $29,792, and the median income for a family was $31,250. Males had a median income of $27,250 versus $26,250 for females. The per capita income for the township was $11,825. There were 11.1% of families and 15.2% of the population living below the poverty line, including 14.3% of under eighteens and 10.5% of those over 64.

References

Townships in Mahnomen County, Minnesota
Townships in Minnesota